UCSF Betty Irene Moore Women's Hospital is a women's hospital in San Francisco, California, part of the  University of California, San Francisco health system. It is part of the UCSF Medical Center camps of Mission Bay. Opened on February 1, 2015, it was the first hospital dedicated to women in the San Francisco Bay Area.

References

External links

 Website
 Fact Sheet

University of California, San Francisco
Hospitals in San Francisco